Joe Ben Wheat (1916–1997) was an American archaeologist, curator, teacher, and author known for his expertise on blanket weavings and textiles of the Navajo and other Indians in Arizona, New Mexico, and Colorado. His research focused on Mogollon, Anasazi, Great Plains Paleo-Indian, and African Paleolithic archaeology.

He served as president of the Society for American Archaeology for two years (1966–67) and was the first Curator of Anthropology for the University of Colorado Museum; a position in which he held from 1953 to 1988. Wheat taught for decades at the University of Colorado in Boulder and contributed to numerous archaeological articles, including the Encyclopædia Britannica. Wheat conducted excavations, most notably the Yellow Jacket Canyon site named the Joe Ben Wheat Site Complex which he investigated for more than 30 years.  He conducted other excavations, too, such as the Olsen-Chubbuck Bison Kill Site and the Jurgens Site.

Personal life 
Joe Ben Wheat was born April 21, 1916 and was raised in the town of Van Horn, Texas by his parents, Luther Peers Wheat, a merchant, and Elizabeth Wheat, a housewife.  His exploration of the local countryside as a child piqued his interest in archaeology. Wheat married musician Frances Irene Moore on April 6, 1947. Joe Ben Wheat died of heart complications June 12, 1997 at the age of 81 and his ashes were scattered at his prized excavation site in Yellow Jacket Canyon.

Early years
Wheat first studied at Sul Ross Teachers College (now Sul Ross University) before transferring to Texas Technological College (now Texas Tech University). It was at Texas Tech that Anthropology professor William Curry Holden influenced him to pursue an education in anthropology at the University of California, Berkeley, where he received his bachelor's degree in 1937.  Wheat accepted an archaeology position at Texas Tech as a field director for the Works Progress Administration in 1939, where he worked until World War II.

In 1941 he joined the United States Army Air Forces and served four years of duty, during which time he became Master Sergeant.

In 1947 he worked for the Smithsonian Institution River Basin Surveys, where he became familiar with the Smithsonian nomenclature for archaeological site numbering, a method in which he made useful later in his career at the Yellow Jacket Colorado excavation site.  Wheat attended the University of Arizona where he advanced his studies in Anthropology and earned his M.A. in 1949 and Ph.D. in 1953. During that time, he also worked as an Instructor of Anthropology and Field Foreman at the Archaeological Field School for the university.  From 1952 to 1953 he was a Ranger and Archaeologist with the U.S. National Park Service at the Grand Canyon.

Career at University of Colorado
Shortly after graduating in 1953 he was hired as the first curator of anthropology by the University of Colorado Museum of Natural History, a position he held for the remainder of his career.  Following his graduation he also started his teaching career in 1953 working as an assistant professor at the University of Colorado in Boulder, Colorado.  In 1957 Wheat became an associate professor and five years later a professor of natural history, a position he maintained until the end of his career in 1988. Throughout his career he was part of many memberships, organizations, and review boards.  Most notably, beginning in 1966 he served two years as president of the Society for American Archaeology.

Excavations
Point of Pines and Crooked Ridge village were two of Wheat's early excavation sites. His dissertation of his work at Crooked Ridge Village was the basis for two publications, which have become standards in Mogollon archaeology. In 1953, shortly after being elected the curator of the University of Colorado Museum, Wheat and the museum received pottery found at the site of a house that had burned down with a letter from a farmer of Yellow Jacket, Colorado.  Wheat recognized that the pottery was probably dated AD 500-750 and accepted the offer, which would allow him to study early pit-house sites of the Mesa Verde region.  Previously named "The Stevenson Site" after the farmer who had found the pottery, Wheat changed the original name to a methodical name using the Smithsonian nomenclature, 5MT1. Wheat's work at Yellow Jacket spanned over 30 years (1954–1991). These three sites, 5MT1-3, had unusual and interesting features never been seen before and were a great discovery of the Mesa Verde region. During this long excavation period at Yellow Jacket Wheat also worked on other excavation sites, such as the Olsen-Chubbuck Bison Kill Site from 1958 to 60 and the Jurgens Site from 1968 to 70.

Sabbatical
In 1972 Wheat took a sabbatical to conduct research on Southwest textiles. He examined hundreds of chemical tests on yarns and visited many museums to study thousands of 19th century textiles, with the goal of establishing "a key for southwestern textiles identification based on the traits that distinguish the Pueblo, Navajo, and Spanish American blanket weaving traditions and provide a better way of identifying and dating pieces of unknown origin.” The years of research resulted in the "groundbreaking" publication of "Blanket Weavings in the Southwest" which was released six years after his death with editorial help by Ann Hedlund, a respected textile scholar and protégée of Wheat.

Key excavations 
Joe Ben Wheat Site Complex at Yellow Jacket, Colorado: Joe Ben Wheat spent nearly his entire career excavating this location. It consists of three major sites 5MT1, 5MT2, and 5MT3.
5MT1: It was the first of the Yellow Jacket excavation sites. It has an occupation that dates back to A.D. 675-700 represented by four semi-subterranean habitation structures and two arcs of work and storage rooms arranged around two small plazas.
5MT2: The research at this site was focused on exposing contemporaneous household occupations. The excavations exposed two small hamlets that were successively occupied in the period of A.D. 1160-1280.
5MT3: The largest of the three sites excavated, it is multi-component pueblo with occupation components dating between A.D. 600-1300. The site consists of four pit-house structures with associated storage rooms. The site was abandoned for three centuries then became occupied again.
Olsen-Chubbuck Bison Kill Site: It dates to about 8000-6500 B.C. Skeletal remains of 190 bison were found in an ancient arroyo, in association with 27 Plano points, a few scrapers, and other ancient artifacts. Wheat has suggested that the number of people involved in the butchering and consumption was probably 150-200.
Jurgens Site: is a Late Paleo-Indian Cody complex site on a South Platte River terrace in Northeastern Colorado. It was the scene of extensive bison-procurement located on a long term habitation, a short term camp, and a butchering station. Among the 2,635 stone and bone artifacts recovered were 63 Kersey points, 32 knives, 84 end scrapers, 30 ground stone tools, 55 stone or mineral specimens, 271 utilized flakes, 2,023 debitage flakes, and 9 bone artifacts.

Memberships and employment 
The following is a list of Wheat's additional employment and association membership information:
Consulting
 Consultant to McGraw-Hill Publishers, 1966.
 John Wesley Powell lectureship of American Association for the Advancement of Science, 1969.
 Consultant to Time-Life Publications, 1972--.

Fellowship and grants
 Ford Foundation fellowship, 1952-53.
 National Science Foundation grants, 1961–65, 1968-69.
 Smithsonian Institution research grants, 1962–63, 1966–67.

Associations and conferences
 American Anthropological Association (fellow).
 American Association for the Advancement of Science (fellow).
 American Ethnological Society
 National Foundation of Arts and Humanities, member of project review board, 1971.
 Plains Anthropological Conference, Chair, 1960.
 Society for American Archaeology (President, 1966–67).

Selected publications 
Ann Hedlund (1993) Why Museums Collect, Papers in Honor of Joe Ben Wheat Archaeological Society of New Mexico, Vol. 19.
Wheat, J.B. Blanket Weaving in the Southwest, edited by Ann Lane Hedlund, University of Arizona Press (Tucson, AZ), 2003.
Wheat, J.B. Prehistoric People of the Northern Southwest, Grand Canyon Natural History Association, revised edition, 1963.
Wheat, J.B. An Archaeological Survey of Addicks Dam Basin, U.S. Government Printing Office, 1953.
Wheat, J.B. Crooked Ridge Village, University of Arizona Press, 1954.
Wheat, J.B. & Irwin, H.T. & Irwin, L.F. University of Colorado Investigations of Paleolithic and Epipaleolithic Sites in the Sudan, Africa, University of Utah Press, 1968.
Wheat, J.B. The Olsen-Chubbuck Site: A Paleo-Indian Bison Kill, Society for American Archaeology, 1972.
Wheat, J.B. The Gift of Spiderwoman: Southwestern Textiles, the Navajo Tradition, University of Pennsylvania (Philadelphia, PA), 1984.

Notes

References

External links 
 The Yellow Jacket Project
 Joe Ben Wheat, Navajo Weaving Collection, University of Colorado Museum
 New York Times Farewell to Joe Ben Wheat
 University of Arizona Book Review Blanket Weaving in the Southwest

1916 births
1997 deaths
People from Culberson County, Texas
UC Berkeley College of Letters and Science alumni
Texas Tech University alumni
University of Arizona alumni
University of Colorado faculty
Sul Ross State University alumni
20th-century American archaeologists
Historians from Texas